Resident Evil is an action horror film series based on the Japanese video game franchise by Capcom.

The German studio Constantin Film bought the rights to adapt the series in January 1997. In 2000, Paul W. S. Anderson was announced as writer and director for Resident Evil (2002). Anderson continued as writer and producer for Resident Evil: Apocalypse (2004) and Resident Evil: Extinction (2007), and returned as the director for Resident Evil: Afterlife (2010), Resident Evil: Retribution (2012) and Resident Evil: The Final Chapter (2016). These first six films follow Alice (Milla Jovovich), a character created for the films. Alice is a former security specialist and covert operative who battles the Umbrella Corporation, whose bioweapons have triggered a zombie apocalypse. Characters from the games appear, including Claire Redfield, Jill Valentine, Ada Wong, Carlos Olivera, Chris Redfield, Leon S. Kennedy, Barry Burton and the antagonists Albert Wesker and James Marcus. In 2021, a reboot film, Resident Evil: Welcome to Raccoon City, was released.

Though the films have received generally negative reviews from critics, the Resident Evil series has grossed over $1.2 billion. It was once the highest-grossing film series based on a video game, the highest-grossing zombie film series, and the highest-grossing horror film series, although it has since been surpassed in all of these categories. The series retains the record for the most live-action film adaptations of a video game.

Films

Original series

Resident Evil (2002)

In January 1997, Constantin Film acquired the film rights to the Resident Evil franchise with Alan B. McElroy possibly writing the script. George A. Romero was hired by Sony Pictures and Capcom to direct and write Resident Evil. His script was later rejected and he was ultimately dropped. While Romero's script was supported by a number of people from Capcom and Constantin, it was rejected by Constantin producer Bernd Eichinger, as well as Capcom producer Yoshiki Okamoto. In late 2000, Paul W. S. Anderson was announced as director and writer. Anderson stated the film would not include any tie-ins with the video game series as "under-performing movie tie-ins are too common and Resident Evil, of all games, deserved a good celluloid representation". In 2001, Milla Jovovich was cast as Alice, the protagonist of the film. By May 2001, Columbia TriStar was in final negotiations to acquire North American distribution rights to the film and budgeted it at $40 million.

In the film, the Umbrella Corporation operates a secret genetic research facility named the Hive. Located beneath Raccoon City, the Hive has been sealed by its AI, the Red Queen, after the release of the T-virus into the facility. The Red Queen kills everyone in the facility to ensure that the T-virus doesn't reach the surface, but the T-virus reanimates them, transforming the humans and animals into aggressive zombies and mutants. Alice was once a security operative working for the corporation until her memory was wiped by the Red Queen's nerve gas. As her team investigates the Hive, a monstrous Umbrella test subject called a Licker pursues them onto a train. Alice survives along with teammate Matt Addison, but they are separated and taken by an Umbrella hazmat unit, where Matt begins to genetically transform. Alice awakens from a coma to a ravaged Raccoon City after a T-virus outbreak.

Resident Evil: Apocalypse (2004)

A sequel began production in 2003 after the success of the first film. Anderson returned as the writer but, due to his work on Alien vs. Predator, Alexander Witt took over the director's role. The film released on September 10, 2004.

In the film, the viral outbreak reaches the surface and to contain the infection, Major Timothy Cain seals all exits to and from Raccoon City. Among the people trapped in the city are Jill Valentine and her partner Peyton Wells. After Alice awakens from her coma, she rescues Jill and Peyton from a group of Licker monsters. They are contacted by Dr. Charles Ashford, who directs them to an evacuation point in exchange for the rescue of his daughter Angela, trapped elsewhere in the city. Weapon Nemesis attacks the team after Cain commands it to kill all STARS (Special Tactics And Rescue Service) members. The team rescues Angela and makes its way to the evacuation helicopter guided by Umbrella mercenary Carlos Olivera. After Alice's confrontation with Cain and Nemesis leaves them dead, she and the team fly away from Raccoon City as it is destroyed by a nuclear missile. The helicopter crashes in the Arklay Mountains, and Alice is found by an Umbrella search team and taken to a research station. When Alice awakens, she displays extraordinary powers, and escapes with help from Jill and Carlos. As they drive away, Dr. Alexander Isaacs, a top-ranking Umbrella employee, reveals that Alice's escape is part of Umbrella's plan.

Resident Evil: Extinction (2007)

In November 2005, Screen Gems gained the rights for the third installment in the franchise, which was then subtitled Extinction. Anderson returned as a writer and filming took place in Mexico. Russell Mulcahy was the director. The film was released on September 21, 2007.

The world has been consumed by the T-virus and Umbrella Corporation develops clones of Alice to find one who displays her powers. Elsewhere, Claire Redfield leads a convoy of survivors across the Nevada desert, including Raccoon City survivors Carlos Olivera and L.J. Wayne. Alice roams the country alone, staying off the grid. After accidentally destroying her motorcycle, she joins Redfield's convoy, rescuing them from a mob of attacking crows using her telekinetic powers. Alice and the convoy head to Las Vegas to gather supplies so that they can reach Alaska to find "Arcadia", thought to be a safe haven. In Las Vegas, they are ambushed by a group of Umbrella Corporation's new super zombies created by Dr. Alexander Isaacs, which kills most of the convoy. L.J., who had been bitten earlier and hiding the progress of the infection, now completely transforms and bites Olivera. Dr. Isaacs himself is bitten and retreats to the Umbrella base where he injects himself with large doses of the anti-virus as a cure. He transforms into a Tyrant, a towering creature with regenerative and psionic powers. Alice, Claire and Carlos locate a helicopter in Umbrella base and plan to use it to extract the survivors to Alaska. Olivera makes his last stand by sacrificing himself and plowing his truck into a horde of zombies, giving the rest time to load the survivors. Claire and the survivors head towards Alaska, while Alice stays behind to confront Isaacs, and discovers her clones in the facility. After she defeats Isaacs, Alice contacts Umbrella and warns them that she is coming for them with an army of her clones.

Resident Evil: Afterlife (2010)

Before the third installment had been released, Constantin prepared to release a fourth entry. The film was set in Japan and filmed in 3D with the Fusion Camera System developed by James Cameron and Vince Pace for the 2009 film Avatar. It was written and directed by Paul W. S. Anderson and released on September 10, 2010.

After the events of Extinction, Alice and her clones attack the Umbrella Headquarters in Tokyo. Wesker escapes and destroys the facility, killing the clones. He is confronted by Alice aboard his helicopter, and injects her with a serum that removes her super-human abilities. The helicopter crashes, and only Alice is seen emerging from the rubble. After six months of a failed aerial search for other survivors, Alice heads toward the supposed location of Arcadia. She lands on an airfield in Alaska, and finds Claire with an Umbrella controlling device attached to her chest and a wiped memory. Claire and Alice fly to Los Angeles, where they stumble on a prison wherein they meet Luther West and Chris Redfield, Claire's brother. The survivors explain that Arcadia is really a tanker off the coast that has been broadcasting a looped message and is picking up survivors. During an attempted escape, Alice, Claire and Chris are the only ones to emerge and they reach the tanker only to find it abandoned. Claire's memory begins to return and she remembers Umbrella workers attacking her group of survivors and moving them to the tanker. They learn that the ship is an Umbrella research facility, which is conducting experiments on the survivors. The three meet Wesker, who has been granted super-human abilities from the T-virus. After the fight, Alice transmits a message to survivors calling them to create a new and true safe haven. As the film closes, a fleet of Umbrella Corporation gunships led by Valentine prepares to lead an assault on the survivors.

Resident Evil: Retribution (2012)

Written and directed by Anderson, Retribution was planned to be filmed back to back with the sixth installment, but Anderson decided to focus on the fifth film. Filming took place in Toronto, Ontario from mid-October to December 23, 2011. Colin Salmon who played One and Michelle Rodriguez who played Rain Ocampo in the first film returned. Oded Fehr, who portrayed Carlos Olivera in the second and third film, also returned. Three characters from the video games made their debut in the film series, Johann Urb as Leon S. Kennedy, Kevin Durand as Barry Burton, and Li Bingbing as Ada Wong. It was released internationally on September 14, 2012.

Alice awakens in an Umbrella base where she is interrogated by Valentine. During a power failure orchestrated by Ada Wong, Alice escapes from her cell and encounters her. Wong explains that Wesker plans to aid Alice's escape and battle the base's supercomputer Red Queen, to save what's left of mankind. Wesker has organized a team of freelance operatives to infiltrate the base and help Alice and Ada escape, including Leon S. Kennedy, Barry Burton and Luther West. Along the way, Alice finds a clone of a girl named Becky. They also face clone versions of Carlos Olivera, One and Rain Ocampo, all under the direction of Valentine. After Alice meets with the rescue team, Valentine's soldiers catch up to them, resulting in a shootout that kills Burton, Olivera and One. Alice, West, Kennedy and Becky reach the surface and are met by a submarine, from which Valentine, the clone Rain, and a captured Ada emerge. Valentine battles Alice while Rain fights Kennedy and West. Alice manages to remove the scarab device from Valentine, returning her back to normal, and joins Kennedy in defeating Rain. Alice, Ada, Becky, Leon and Valentine travel to Wesker's base. Wesker injects Alice with the T-virus, returning her superhuman powers, then tells her that she is responsible for saving the remaining humans from extinction.

Resident Evil: The Final Chapter (2016)

Anderson wrote and directed the sixth and final film in the series, subtitled The Final Chapter, which was filmed in 2D and was post-converted to stereoscopic 3D. Milla Jovovich reprised her role as Alice, with only Shawn Roberts, Iain Glen and Ali Larter returning from previous entries as Albert Wesker, Dr. Isaacs and Claire Redfield, respectively. Continuing from the last film, Anderson expressed his desire for the final film to "come full circle", bringing back characters, themes and the environment of the Hive from the first movie. Filming was set to begin in South Africa in August 2014 but was delayed to the summer of 2015 due to Jovovich's pregnancy. Principal photography commenced on September 18, 2015, in South Africa. It was released on December 23, 2016, in Tokyo and on January 27, 2017, in North America.

Three weeks after the events in Retribution, humanity is on its last legs after Alice is betrayed by Wesker in Washington D.C. Alice encounters the Red Queen, who tells her that she must return to Raccoon City, where the Umbrella Corporation has developed an airborne anti-virus which will kill every organism infected by the T-virus. In a race against time, Alice is captured by Dr. Isaacs, who reveals his previous incarnation was a clone. Alice escapes and arrives in Raccoon City, where she joins forces with Claire Redfield. After holding off Dr. Isaacs' undead army, Alice, Claire and a team of survivors make their way towards the Hive. They encounter the Red Queen, who tells them the T-virus was created by James Marcus, the founder of the Umbrella Corporation to save his daughter, Alicia, from an ailment that caused her to age rapidly. James was betrayed by his business partner, Dr. Isaacs, and killed by Albert Wesker. Dr. Isaacs and the board of the Umbrella Corporation then intended to release the T-virus to cleanse the world, save the rich and powerful with cryogenics in the Hive, and later rebuild it as they desire. After confronting Wesker and the real Dr. Isaacs at the bottom of the Hive, Alice learns she is a clone of the still-living Alicia Marcus. Alice releases the anti-virus, eliminating all infected by the T-virus. She survives, and gains the memories of Alicia Marcus as a reward to reclaim the childhood she never had. The series ends with Alice riding a motorcycle, stating that her job isn't finished yet and that it will take several years for the anti-virus to circle the globe.

Reboot

Resident Evil: Welcome to Raccoon City (2021)

In May 2017, Constantin chairman Martin Moszkowicz stated that a reboot of the series was in development. In the same month, it was announced that James Wan would produce the reboot with a script by Greg Russo, with both later leaving the project. In December 2018, Johannes Roberts was hired as writer and director. Roberts stated that his film will be separate from the previous films in the series, with the story being based on Resident Evil and Resident Evil 2. By October 2020, the principal cast was reported with Kaya Scodelario cast as Claire Redfield, Hannah John-Kamen as Jill Valentine, Robbie Amell as Chris Redfield, Neal McDonough as William Birkin, Tom Hopper as Albert Wesker, and Avan Jogia as Leon S. Kennedy. Other cast members, Donal Logue, Chad Rook, Lily Gao, and Marina Mazepa were cast as Chief Brian Irons, Richard Aiken, and Ada Wong, and Lisa Trevor respectively. Filming began on October 17, 2020, in Sudbury, Ontario, Canada, with reshoots in May 2021. The film was released on November 24, 2021, by Sony Pictures Releasing in the United States.

Claire Redfield uncovers secrets about the Umbrella Corporation's experiments and accidents and travels back to her hometown of Raccoon City to warn her brother Chris Redfield. Meanwhile, a zombie outbreak begins after residents are poisoned in the water supply. Chris, along with fellow STARS members Jill Valentine and Albert Wesker, travel to the Spencer Mansion to recover bravo team and find out what is happening in the town. Claire travels with rookie police officer Leon S. Kennedy to the Raccoon City Orphanage to flee the city before it is destroyed, where they encounter a Licker and Claire's old friend Lisa Trevor. Wesker betrays Jill and attempts to steal the virus produced by Dr. William Birkin, a scientist working for the Umbrella Corporation. On the verge of death, Birkin injects himself with the G-Virus, saving his life and mutating him into the Tyrant. The survivors flee on an underground train with Birkin's daughter Sherry and destroy the tyrant with a rocket launcher. In a mid-credits scene, Albert Wesker is saved from death by Ada Wong and is given his trademark sunglasses.

Cancelled projects

Underworld crossover 
In 2016, producer David Kern revealed that a crossover film with the Underworld film series had been considered.

Spin-off TV series 
In January 2019, Netflix was in development of a series based upon the Resident Evil franchise. At the time, Deadline Hollywood reported that the series was set in the universe of the Paul W. S. Anderson's film series, but when the series was ordered in 2020, Andrew Dabb was hired and confirmed that the series will not be linked to the film series.

Cast and crew

Principal cast

 This table shows the major characters that were featured in the films, sorted according to the actors' billing order,  those adapted from the video games.
 A dark grey cell indicates that the character was not in the film.
 A  indicates the character was adapted from the video games.
 An  indicates an original character that was later adapted by the video games.
 A  indicates a role as a younger version of the character.
 A  indicates an uncredited role.
 A  indicates a cameo role.
 A  indicates a voice-only role.
 An  indicates an appearance through archival footage or stills.

Additional crew

Reception

Box office performance

Apocalypse, Extinction, Afterlife, and Retribution all opened at number one at the North American box office. Resident Evil is also the highest-grossing, live-action film series to be based on a video game.

Critical and public response

The first six films, all written and produced by Anderson, generally received mixed to negative reviews from critics. However, they have gained a cult following among a distinct subset of reviewers. The Chicago Tribune declared the first film as "one of the few video game movies to truly re-create the gaming experience". The Austin Chronicle called it "an absolute wreck. But what an ambitiously mind-blowing wreck it is, bursting with dazzlingly sordid cinematography". The Seattle Times marked the second film an improvement from the original, saying the film "makes up for the wretched mess that was 2002's Resident Evil". The Hollywood Reporter gave the third film a positive review stating "Fast-paced and filled with brisk action sequences—the film should reasonably satisfy the devotees." Michael Ordoña of the Los Angeles Times gave the fourth film a positive review, claiming that "the action is easier to read than in most films of the genre, and therefore more enjoyable. Anderson makes particular use of sets and locations to wring out more bang for the stereoscopic buck."

Several retrospective reviews have praised aspects of Anderson's films, particularly in relation to the reboot. Calum Marsh of the National Post admired the Anderson-directed entries, saying: "The first is classical, close-quarters horror ... Part four, Afterlife, is a riot of ludicrous action and superhero brawn ... but it’s a mere amuse bouche next to the five-star spread of part five, Retribution—a glorious, practically experimental sci-fi action wonder." Ignatiy Vishnevetsky of The A.V. Club called them "lean and lively and fun and totally unpretentious", and commended Anderson's style, "focused on organizing action and orientating the viewer"; Charles Bramesco reviewed the reboot as "totally bereft of the visual distinction or creative personality that often made its predecessors intriguing diamonds in the rough."

Home media
Sony Pictures Home Entertainment has released all seven films on DVD, Blu-ray and digital download. The films were also released in DVD, Blu-ray and 4K box sets:

Other media

Novelizations
The novelizations for the first three Resident Evil films were written by Keith R. A. DeCandido. The novelization for the fifth film was written by John Shirley, and the sixth by Tim Waggoner. The fourth film did not receive a novelization.

The novel for the first film, titled Resident Evil: Genesis, was published over two years after that film's release, while the Extinction novel was released in late July 2007, two months before the film's release. There was also a Japanese novelization of the first film, unrelated to DeCandido's version, written by Osamu Makino. Makino also wrote two novels based on the game Resident Evil: The Umbrella Chronicles.

See also
 List of highest-grossing horror films
 Resident Evil (video game series)

Notes

References

 
Action film series
Capcom franchises
Film series introduced in 2002
Science fiction horror film series
Films about rebellions
Screen Gems franchises
German film series
Mad scientist films